Cornelius Warren (March 15, 1790 – July 28, 1849) was a United States representative from New York. Born in Phillipstown, Putnam County, he completed preparatory studies, studied law, was admitted to the bar and commenced the practice of law. He served in local offices including Justice of the Peace, and was appointed judge of the Putnam County Court of Common Pleas in 1841 and served until 1843.  He was elected as a Whig to the Thirtieth Congress, holding office from March 4, 1847, to March 3, 1849. He died at Cold Spring; interment was in the Old Cemetery.

Warren's daughter Hannah M. was married to New York state senator Charles A. Fowler.

References

1790 births
1849 deaths
People from Putnam County, New York
New York (state) state court judges
Whig Party members of the United States House of Representatives from New York (state)
19th-century American politicians
19th-century American judges